Agastache urticifolia is a species of flowering plant in the mint family known by the common name nettleleaf giant hyssop or horse mint.

Distribution
It is native to western North America from British Columbia to California to Colorado, where it grows in many habitat types. This is an aromatic perennial herb growing an erect stem with widely spaced leaves, each lance-shaped to nearly triangular and toothed.

Description
The leaves are up to 8 centimeters long and 7 wide. The inflorescence is a dense spike of many flowers. Each flower has long sepals tipped with bright purple and tubular corollas in shades of pink and purple. The fruit is a light brown, fuzzy nutlet about 2 millimeters long.

Uses 
The dried leaves and flowers can be made into tea. It has been used medicinally to treat rheumatism, upset stomachs, and colds.

The plant was used medicinally by several Native American groups, especially the leaves.

References

External links

Jepson Manual Treatment
USDA Plants Profile
Ethnobotany
Photo gallery

urticifolia
Flora of the United States
Flora of California
Flora of Colorado
Flora of Idaho
Flora of Montana
Flora of Nevada
Flora of Oregon
Flora of Utah
Flora of Washington (state)
Flora of Wyoming
Flora of British Columbia
Flora without expected TNC conservation status